Feijóo  or Feijão is a Spanish, Galician and Portuguese surname. It is also considered a Sephardic Jewish Surname.

People with surname or its variants include:
 Alfonso Feijoo, Spanish footballer.
 Benito Jerónimo Feijóo y Montenegro, Spanish scholar.
 Diogo Antônio Feijó, Brazilian politician.
 Lorena Feijóo, Cuban ballet dancer.
 Lorna Feijóo, Cuban ballet dancer.
 Pablo Feijoo, Spanish rugby sevens coach and player.
 Samuel Feijóo, Cuban writer.
 Juan Carlos Navarro Feijoo, Spanish basketball player.
 Alberto Núñez Feijóo, Spanish politician.

References

Surnames
Galician-language surnames
Portuguese-language surnames
Sephardic surnames